Grand Princess is a  cruise ship owned by Princess Cruises. It was built in 1998 by Fincantieri Cantieri Navali Italiani in Monfalcone, Italy, with yard number 5956, at a cost of approximately US$450 million. She was the largest and most expensive passenger ship ever built at the time. Grand Princess  was the flagship in the Princess Cruises fleet until the new  took that title in June 2013.

History

Grand Princess was the first of the s debuting in 1998, and christened by Olivia de Havilland.  When Grand Princess was launched, she featured in the Princess Cruises brochures as a Sun-class ship; it was only with the subsequent launch of  that the Grand class appeared in brochures.The ship has a different decor scheme to her sister ships, using darker woods, and the interior decor is more similar to the smaller  ships.

Grand Princess was the setting for a task in the second series of the UK version of the reality TV show The Apprentice.

Grand Princess has a large theater, a large central performance lounge, and an aft show lounge.

On 19 July 2009, the ship was drydocked for 14 days for refurbishments such as boosting Grand Princess's energy and environmental efficiency.

Refit 
In May 2011, Grand Princess completed the most extensive dry-dock in Princess Cruises history that included a refit and removal of the nightclub from her stern. This resolved her tendency to sail bow high, and has improved her fuel economy by about 3–4%. The bow high tendency was peculiar to Grand Princess, and does not affect any of the other Grand-class ships (or the derivative classes) as unlike Grand Princess they have aluminium upper decks. In March 2019, Grand Princess underwent another dry-dock refurbishment.

Incidents

2017 whale incident 
On 9 August 2017, a dead humpback whale was found stuck on the bow of the ship after it docked in Ketchikan, Alaska. Princess Cruises issued a statement that said "It is unknown how or when this happened as the ship felt no impact. It is also unknown, at this time, whether the whale was alive or already deceased before becoming lodged on the bow." It was the second time in two years that a whale had been carried into an Alaska port on the bow of a cruise ship.

2020 coronavirus pandemic

References

Bibliography

External links 

 
 The picture of Grand Princess departing from Fort Lauderdale post refit.

Ships of Princess Cruises
Ships built in Monfalcone
1998 ships
Ships built by Fincantieri
Cruise ships involved in the COVID-19 pandemic